The Ionia Volcano (also referred to as Burnt Bluff or Volcano Hill) is a heat-producing bluff located east of Newcastle, Nebraska, although it has commonly been mistaken for an active volcano. The site was originally considered sacred by the Ponca and Arapaho Native American Tribes, and was documented by William Clark on the Lewis and Clark Expedition. In 1878, flooding by the Missouri River resulted in the nearby town of Ionia, its namesake, being abandoned and a large portion of the bluff collapsing. Erosion and subsequent flooding has since collapsed the rest of the bluff. The Ionia Volcano has erupted twice, once in 1879 and again in 1901, with the latter eruption preceding a period of dormancy. The Ionia Volcano would sporadically become active throughout the 1900s but this was largely confined to smoke and steam output. The heat generated by the bluff is the byproduct of iron sulfide oxidation in carbonaceous shale when exposed to moisture and oxygen due to erosion. 

Modern analysis has called into question if the bluff was witnessed by the Lewis and Clark Expedition or if another burning bluff in Maskell, Nebraska was observed. The site is classified as a High Potential Historic Site by the United States National Park Service.

Geology and Chemistry 
The Ionia Volcano is a bluff formation largely made of bluish colored Cretaceous age carlite shale and clay. The bluff contains large quantities of selenite (in the form of gypsum) and contains multiple fossil layers. In particular, fossil samples of Subprionocyclus percarinatus have been found in the clay at the Ionia Volcano. While the bluff in 1804 was approximately 200 ft tall, the modern shale layers only protrude a few feet out of the ground, making surveying difficult. This drop in height is due to erosion by the Missouri river, which has now buried 70% of the shale in colluvium.

The heat reaction within the bluff is due to carlite shale's high iron sulfide (FeS2) concentration, mainly in the form of marcasite, halotrichite, and jarosite. These minerals give the soil a color composition ranging from dark yellow to blue. This demonstrates itself as a white crust over the soil surface with blue, hair-like crystals extending through the clay layers. The iron sulfide favorably reacts with oxygen (O2) and water (H2O), forming ferrous iron (Fe+2) and ferric iron (Fe+3). Water is retained by the clay in carlite shale, enabling the trapped water to readily react with iron sulfide. This reaction is exothermic and prone to forming a feedback loop, as ferric iron is capable of oxidizing more iron sulfide. Furthermore, the reaction will produce hydrons (H+) as a byproduct, which will lower the surrounding soil pH to as low as 3-5 and attract acidophilic bacteria that can also oxidize iron sulfide. Smectite clay is present in bluff but is more commonly acid weathered to bentonite and kaolinite. The Ionia Volcano periodically erupted due to heat produced when erosion exposed fresh carlite shale and iron sulfide to water, resulting in a violent reaction.

History 
The first known accounts of Ionia Volcano come from the Ponca Tribe, who believed the site to be sacred. In 1896, William Huse, in his book The History of Dixon County, Nebraska, claimed the Arapaho Tribe also believed the site to be sacred, stating that chiefs and medicine men would perform sacrificial ceremonies at the bluff. The first western documentation of the volcano was supposedly made by the Lewis and Clark Expedition. The expedition arrived at the Ionia Volcano on August 22, 1804, camped at the site for two days, and conversed with the local Native American tribes about its religious significance. On August 24, 1804, Captain Clark wrote:

Clark went on to describe the volcano as having a "sulfurous smell". Throughout the early 1800s, fur traders and explorers reported wildfires and dense smoke within the region. In 1832 and 1833, George Catlin, Carl Bogmer, and Jages Doppelheim all documented visiting the Ionia Volcano. In 1839, French explorer and geographer, J. N. Nicollet, traveled to the region and attempted to prove that the Ionia Volcano's heat was not volcanic in origin. Nicollet theorized that the decomposition of iron pyrite in water was the source of the heat and fire. In 1874, the bluff was named the "Ionia Volcano" by John Harwood Pierce in the Omaha Daily Bee. Pierce named the bluff after the nearby town of Ionia, established in 1856. During this period, the site became a local attraction for tourists and geologists. Pierce would describe the encounter:

Pierce also stated that large fissures would form in the ground, radiating heat outward, and that the bluff was constructed largely of clay with gypsum formations and fossil layers. Joseph Brewer, a local businessman, had excavated a large fossil around this time that he would later take on country-wide tours. In 1877, Nebraska experienced one of the strongest earthquakes in it's recorded history, resulting in fears from the locals that the Ionia Volcano may erupt. Residents believed that after the 1874 redirection of the Missouri river, the Ionia Volcano was at risk of explosion. This prompted renewed scientific interest in the site, with the predominant theory at the time being that the Ionia Volcano was an actual volcano with a magma chamber deep below the surface. In 1878, the Missouri River flooded, collapsing a large section of the Ionia Volcano. This also caused heavy damage to Ionia and resulted in the town being abandoned. In 1879, the Ionia Volcano erupted, then entered into a state of dormancy. The New York Times reported that the prior collapse was partially caused by the Ionia Volcano heating the banks of the Missouri river, destabilizing it. They further postulated that the eruptions were caused by the mixing of the lime, bi-sulfate, iron and/or coal rock layers. A second flood in 1881 destroyed the rest of the bluff, resulting in activity ceasing altogether. In 1882, historian A. T. Andreas reported that the site received little interest following its collapse.

On July 29th, 1893, hunters began reporting that a fissure had reopened and the site had become active again. Around 1900, a reporter was caught building a fire on the Ionia Volcano in an attempt to show the volcano was still active. In 1901, the Ionia Volcano erupted again.  The 1902 eruption of Mount Pelée, sparked renewed interest in the Ionia Volcano as it had begun smoking again, with some newspapers calling for the governor to send the national guard to suppress the fires. In 1906, Erwin H. Barbour  and George E. Condra, researchers from the University of Nebraska, published “Geography of Nebraska” and confirmed Nicollet's hypothesis that the oxidation of iron pyrite in carbonaceous shale when exposed to water by erosion was the chief cause of the heat. In 1940, following decades of dormancy, the Ionia Volcano began showing signs of activity, prompting fears of another eruption. This increased activity was mainly in the form of steam being given off from the site due to limestone and water coming into contact, and the glow of underground fires could be seen from a distance. 

The current site of the Ionia Volcano's remains is located near Newcastle, Nebraska, near the ghost town of Ionia, Nebraska, and across from the Ionia Cemetery.  A historical marker describing the "volcano"  is also located in nearby Newcastle. The United States National Park Service considers the site a High Potential Historic Site.

Analysis 
In 2011, the Lewis and Clark Trail Heritage Foundation published a report on the Ionia Volcano. In this report, geologist John W. Jengo claimed that the burning bluff described in Clark's journal was not the Ionia Volcano, but rather, another burning bluff located near Maskell, Nebraska. This finding was made following a historic reconstruction of the Missouri River's 1804 channel, in which he found that the Lewis and Clark expedition had supposedly visited a site near the Ionia Volcano on Aug. 22 but didn't report it till Aug. 24. The report concluded that the expedition had reported a separate burning bluff and the expedition was located on the opposite side of the Missouri river, relative to the Ionia Volcano. Jengo also claimed that burning bluffs were relatively commonplace along the Missouri river during the 1800s, but few are still active today, the result of most of them having been submerged by flooding.

See also 
 Missouri River Valley

References 

Landforms of Nebraska
Landforms of Dixon County, Nebraska